Charlotte Elizabeth Cavendish, Marchioness of Hartington, 6th Baroness Clifford (born Lady Charlotte Boyle; 27 October 1731 – 8 December 1754) was the daughter of Richard Boyle, 3rd Earl of Burlington and Lady Dorothy Savile. From 1748 until her death she was married to William Cavendish, Marquess of Hartington, later the 4th Duke of Devonshire and Prime Minister of Great Britain.

Family and early life

Lady Charlotte Elizabeth Boyle was the only surviving daughter of Richard Boyle, 3rd Earl of Burlington and Lady Dorothy Savile. Her mother was the daughter of William Savile, 2nd Marquess of Halifax.

Personal life 
On 28 March 1748, she married William Cavendish, then the Marquess of Hartington, who later became the 4th Duke of Devonshire and the Prime Minister of Great Britain. The advantageous union had been arranged since childhood and was happy. The marriage helped him rise politically. They had four children: William, Dorothy, Richard, and George.

Baroness Clifford of Londesborough
Charlotte inherited great wealth upon the death of her father in 1754. As the heir of her father, she succeeded to the title of Baroness Clifford of Londesborough suo jure. Through her marriage, the Cavendish family, with the main title of Duke of Devonshire, inherited the 3rd Earl of Burlington's estates (the title went to the Orrery Boyles). These estates included: Burlington House, Piccadilly, London (now the Royal Academy of Arts); Chiswick House, London; Londesborough Hall, Yorkshire; Bolton Abbey, Yorkshire; Lismore Castle, County Waterford, Ireland. Charlotte was her father's sole remaining heir.

The Marchioness of Hartington died on 8 December 1754 at Uppingham, Rutland from smallpox. The next year her husband William succeeded his father as Duke of Devonshire.

Issue
Charlotte and her husband William had four children:

 William Cavendish, 5th Duke of Devonshire (14 December 1748 – 29 July 1811)
 Lady Dorothy Cavendish (27 August 1750 – 3 June 1794), who married William Cavendish-Bentinck, 3rd Duke of Portland.
 Lord Richard Cavendish (19 June 1752 – 7 September 1781)
 George Augustus Henry Cavendish, 1st Earl of Burlington (31 March 1754 – 4 May 1834)

Ancestors

References

Works cited

1731 births
1754 deaths
Clifford, Charlotte Cavendish, 6th Baroness
06
Daughters of British earls
Daughters of Irish earls
Deaths from smallpox
Charlotte Cavendish, Marchioness of Hartington
British courtesy marchionesses
Infectious disease deaths in England
People from Uppingham
Charlotte
Wives of knights